Svetlana Viktorovna Khodchenkova (born 21 January 1983) is a Russian film, television and theater actress. She is an Honored Artist of the Russian Federation (2018).

Early life
Was born in Moscow, Russian SFSR, Soviet Union. She briefly worked for a modeling agency.

In 2005 Graduated from the Boris Shchukin Theatre Institute, where she studied under the direction of Mikhail Borisovich Borisov.

Career
Khodchenkova’s debut-role was in the film Bless the Woman (2003) directed by Stanislav Govorukhin. For this role she was nominated for "Nika" award as Best Actress. She continued her career in the role of a clairvoyant Cassandra historical television series Talisman of Love (2005).
Svetlana played a ballerina in Pavel Sanaev’s film Kilometer Zero (2007).

In 2008, at the Polish Film Festival she won the award for Best Actress in Little Moscow.

She is also known for her roles in box office films Love in the Big City (2009), its sequel, Love in the Big City 2 (2010), and Office Romance. Our Time (2011).

She starred in the TV-series Lavrova's Method (2011), and appeared as Irina in Tinker Tailor Soldier Spy (2011). Khodchenkova attended the premiere of "Tinker, Tailor, Soldier, Spy" at the 68th Venice Film Festival, on September 5, 2011. She co-starred with Hugh Jackman in the 2013 superhero film The Wolverine as  Viper, one of the film's antagonists.

Khodchenkova played the leading role, Irina the Greek woman, in the historical action film Viking (2016).

Personal life
On 13 December 2005, she married her classmate Vladimir Yaglych, a Russian actor. In 2010, they divorced.
In May 2015, she was engaged to Moscow businessman Georgiy Petrishin. In February 2016, the couple called off the engagement.

Filmography

Film

Television

Theatre
These free Butterflies  (STD Theatre Centre (WTO) of the Russian Federation On Strastnom) 
Hospital  Moulin Rouge  (Independent Theater Project) 
Santa Claus - Bastard!  (Independent Theater Project)
Theatre with and without Rules  (Independent Theater Project)
Love Story  (Independent Theater Project)

References

External links

1983 births
Living people
Russian film actresses
Russian stage actresses
Russian television actresses
Actresses from Moscow
21st-century Russian actresses
United Russia politicians
21st-century Russian politicians
Honored Artists of the Russian Federation